Grateful Dead is an album by rock band the Grateful Dead. Released on September 24, 1971 on Warner Bros. Records, it is their second live double album and their seventh album overall. Although published without a title, it is generally known by the names Skull and Roses (due to its iconic cover art) and Skull Fuck (the name the band originally wanted to give to the album, which was rejected by the record company). It was the group's first album to be certified gold by the RIAA and remained their best seller until surpassed by Skeletons from the Closet.

Recording and release
Unlike Live/Dead, the album contained several lead and background vocal overdubs. For the three new original compositions ("Bertha", "Playing in the Band", and "Wharf Rat"), the band invited Jerry Garcia associate Merl Saunders to overdub organ parts. This made the organ playing of Saunders more prominent than that of Pigpen, whose contributions tend to be buried in the mix.

"Playing in the Band" received a good amount of airplay, and became one of the Dead's most played songs in concert (a studio version was released the following year on rhythm guitarist Bob Weir's solo album Ace). The closing segue of "Not Fade Away" into "Goin' Down The Road Feeling Bad" also received airplay and became a fan favorite.

The album's cover art, composed by Alton Kelly and Stanley Mouse, is based on an illustration by Edmund Joseph Sullivan for an old edition of the Rubaiyat of Omar Khayyam. Though the album has been known by the sobriquet "Skull & Roses", the original vertical gatefold cover unfolds to reveal the entire skeleton. The graphic became one of the images most associated with the band.

Opening track "Bertha" fades in on the original version of the album, in semblance of entering the performance space. A longer, full opening is used on CD/digital copies. More tracks from the same source concerts were later released on Ladies and Gentlemen... the Grateful Dead.

The 7" single release of "Johnny B. Goode" (a split single with Elvin Bishop) was actually the version from the album Fillmore: The Last Days. However, the version from this album was later used as a B-side on the re-release of the "Truckin'" single.

The album was remastered and expanded for the 2001 box set The Golden Road. This version, with three bonus tracks (two contemporaneous live tracks and a hidden promotional track) and the extended "Bertha", was released separately, in 2003.

The 50th Anniversary Edition of Skull and Roses was released on June 25, 2021, in CD, LP, and digital formats.  The CD includes a bonus disc of songs recorded live at the Fillmore West in San Francisco on July 2, 1971.

Title and message

When the band submitted "Skull Fuck" (a contemporary euphemism for "blow your mind") as the album title, it was rejected by the record label. Ultimately the agreement was made that the album would be published without the title appearing anywhere on the record labels or cover artwork. Though the band refers to the album by this title, and it has long been known to fans (through interviews with band members, the Deadhead network and other outlets), the alternate, descriptive title "Skull & Roses" developed among distributors, music buyers and reviewers as a graphic incipit from the cover artwork.

Drummer Bill Kreutzmann explained the lack of a title on the artwork and labels, "...the original name was going to be "Skull Fuck". This was a time long before rap artists like Eminem numbed concerned citizens to the idea of offensive language in music. Warner Brothers freaked out on us. They said stores would boycott it and we wouldn't be able to get it on shelves."

Inside the gatefold of the original LP, the band reached out directly to its burgeoning fan base, which had begun to attend multiple concerts in a row and collect live audio tapes of each concert, with a message reading:
The mailing address is no longer valid.

Track listing

The four sides of the vinyl album were combined as tracks 1–11 on CD reissues.

Note: More songs from the April 25 – 29, 1971 shows at the Fillmore East are included in Ladies and Gentlemen... the Grateful Dead.

Personnel

Grateful Dead
 Jerry Garcia – lead guitar, vocals
 Bob Weir – rhythm guitar, vocals
 Phil Lesh – bass guitar, vocals
 Bill Kreutzmann – drums
 Ron "Pigpen" McKernan – organ, harmonica, vocals

Additional musicians
 Merl Saunders – organ on "Bertha", "Playing in the Band", "Wharf Rat"

Production
 Produced by Grateful Dead
 Recording: Bob Matthews, Betty Cantor
 Artwork: Alton Kelley
 Photo: Bob Seidemann

Production – 50th Anniversary Edition
 Produced for release by David Lemieux
 Mastering: David Glasser
 Tape restoration and speed correction: Jamie Howarth, John Chester
 Recording – Fillmore West bonus disc: Rex Jackson
 Design: Steve Vance
 Liner notes essay: Gary Lambert

Charts and certification
Billboard

RIAA certification

Notes

1971 live albums
Grateful Dead live albums
Live at the Fillmore East albums
Warner Records live albums